Kurre Lansburgh (born 28 May 1977) is a Swedish freestyle skier. He competed in the men's moguls event at the 1998 Winter Olympics.

References

External links
 

1977 births
Living people
Swedish male freestyle skiers
Olympic freestyle skiers of Sweden
Freestyle skiers at the 1998 Winter Olympics
Sportspeople from Uppsala
20th-century Swedish people
21st-century Swedish people